Castillon-la-Bataille is a commune in the Gironde department in Nouvelle-Aquitaine in southwestern France. Castillon station has rail connections to Bordeaux, Bergerac and Sarlat-la-Canéda.

This area was the site of the last battle of the Hundred Years' War, the Battle of Castillon, fought July 17, 1453. Castillon-la-Bataille, on the Dordogne river, saw the battle in which John Talbot, 1st Earl of Shrewsbury, charged valiantly but foolishly at the French artillery and was slain at the age of nearly 70, along with his son, John Talbot, 1st Viscount Lisle, and most of the rest of the small English force that had gone out to try to prevent Bordeaux falling to the French king.

Near La Mothe-Montraval, on the right bank of the Dordogne, a tumulus is pointed out under the name of Talbot's tomb; but it is known that his body was removed by his friends to St Alkmund's Church, Whitchurch, in Shropshire in England.

On November 27, 1953, the name of the town was changed from Castillon-sur-Dordogne to its current name.

Population

See also
 Castillonnais (Gironde)
 Communes of the Gironde department

References

External links

Communes of Gironde